Irati (  is a Basque feminine given name meaning “fern field”. It was among the ten most popular names given to newborn girls in the Basque community in Spain in 2021.

People
Irati Idiakez (born 1996), Spanish para-snowboarder
Irati Idirin (born 1994), Spanish professional racing cyclist
Irati Martín (born 2003), Spanish footballer
Irati Santiago Mujika (born 1991), Spanish film and video producer

Notes

Basque feminine given names